Al-Sabkhah  is a Syrian town located in Raqqa District, Raqqa.  According to the Syria Central Bureau of Statistics (CBS), Al-Sabkhah had a population of 11,567 in the 2004 census.

References 

Populated places in Raqqa District